Panal (also Romanized as 'Pāna‘l; also known as Pā Na‘l Jangal) is a village in Jangal Rural District, in the Central District of Fasa County, Fars Province, Iran. At the 2006 census, its population was 89, in 19 families.

References 

Populated places in Fasa County